Alfred Parsons may refer to:
 Alfred Parsons (diplomat)
 Alfred Parsons (artist)

See also
 Alfred Lauck Parson, British chemist and physicist